The Cook is a c.1570 oil on panel painting by Giuseppe Arcimboldo, now in the Nationalmuseum in Stockholm. It is a still life of roasted meats - when the painting is turned upside-down, these form a human face via pareidolia. The painter also produced The Fruit Basket and The Gardener, using a similar effect.

The attribution to Arcimboldo is disputed.

References

Paintings by Giuseppe Arcimboldo
1570s paintings
Paintings in the collection of the Nationalmuseum Stockholm
Death in art
Food and drink paintings